This was the first edition of the event.

Guido Andreozzi and Guillermo Durán won the title, defeating Alejandro González and César Ramírez 6–3, 6–4 in the final.

Seeds

Draw

Draw

References
 Main Draw

Claro Open Cali - Doubles
2014 Doubles
Claro Open Cali - Doubles